Dave Zeltserman is an American novelist, born in Boston, Massachusetts on 23 May 1959. He has published noir, mystery, thriller, and horror novels, including Small Crimes and Pariah. He won both the Shamus and Derringer awards for his novelette Julius Katz in 2010. He also writes Morris Brick serial killer thrillers under the pseudonym Jacob Stone. His novel Small Crimes was made into a Netflix Original film starring Nikolaj Coster-Waldau.

Novels
 Fast Lane (2004)
 Bad Thoughts (2007)
 Small Crimes (2008), selected by NPR as one of the 5 best crime and mystery novels of 2008. and The Washington Postas one of the best books of the year.
 Bad Karma (2009)
 Pariah (2009), selected by The Washington Postas one of the best books of 2009.
 Killer (2010)
 The Caretaker of Lorne Field (2010), short listed by ALA for best horror novel of 2010 and Black Quill Nominee for Best Dark Genre novel of 2010.
 Outsourced (2011)
 Blood Crimes (2011)
 Dying Memories (2011)
 Julius Katz and Archie (2011)
 A Killer's Essence (2011)
 Monster: A novel of Frankenstein (2012), selected by Booklist for their 2013 list of top 10 horror novels and WBUR for their favorite novels of 2012
 The Boy Who Killed Demons (2014)
The Interloper (2014)
 Deranged (written as Jacob Stone, 2017)
 Crazed (written as Jacob Stone, 2017)
 Malicious (written as Jacob Stone, 2018) 
 Husk (2018) 
Cruel (written as Jacob Stone, 2018)
Unleashed (written as Jacob Stone, 2019) 
The Tenth Wish (2019)
Everybody Lies in Hell (2019)

Awards
 Pariah 2009 New England Book Festival Award
 Julius Katz 2010 Shamus Award
 Julius Katz 2010 Derringer Award
 Archie's Been Framed 2010 EQMM Readers Award
 Archie Solves the Case 2013 EQMM Readers Award
 Cramer in Trouble 2017 3rd place EQMM Readers Award

References

External links
Official Site

Living people
1959 births
American horror novelists
American mystery writers
American male novelists
21st-century American novelists
21st-century American male writers